Nancy Wood may refer to:

 Nancy Wood (journalist), Canadian television journalist
 Nancy Wood (author) (1936–2013), American author, poet and photographer
 Nancy Farley Wood (1903–2003), member of the Manhattan Project